Albert C. Zapanta (born March 8, 1941) is best known as a high-level trade ambassador in his 13-year role as CEO of the Dallas-based U.S.-Mexico Chamber of Commerce. Zapanta is also known as a highly decorated hero of the Viet Nam war, an advisor to Presidents, and a former head of Public Affairs for Atlantic Richfield (ARCO),

Biography

Early life
He received an Associate of Arts from East Los Angeles College, a Bachelor of Arts in Industrial Psychology, a Master of Arts in Public Administration from the University of Southern California. Mr. Zapanta also graduated from the Harvard Graduate School of Business, the Inter-American Defense College at the National War College, Washington, D.C. He graduated from the Harvard Graduate School of Business and the Inter-American Defense College, the National War College, in Washington, D.C.

Military career
Mr. Zapanta was a member of the Department of State's Advisory Committee on International Trade, Technology and Development, and was appointed the first U.S. senior officer to lead a peacekeeping mission to the United Nations Referendum on the Western Sahara to serve with USSR, People's Republic of China, French and British military officers as the Chief of Staff. General Zapanta's military record includes the award of the Silver Star, five Bronze Stars for Valor, the Purple Heart and thirty other awards during the Vietnam War. He was also recently awarded the Joint Service Commendation Medal for Desert Shield/Desert Storm, Restore Hope in Somalia and Restore Democracy in Haiti.

Career
He started his career at Bethlehem Steel. He also served as Assistant Secretary of the Interior for Management and Administration from 1976 to 1977. From 1978 to 1993, he worked as a lobbyist for ARCO after which he retired.

He currently serves as President and CEO of the United States-Mexico Chamber of Commerce and previously sat on the Board of Directors of Tyson Foods.

Leadership in Energy Sector
Albert Zapanta as CEO of PAZ Energy, LLC, partnered with Chesapeake Energy to consult and advise DFW Airport authorities on the potential viability of safely extracting stranded energy assets beneath the airport grounds, to allow hydraulic fracturing wells below the airport in a $2 billion natural gas project on 18,800 acres of the airport.  Albert Zapanta was also Founder, Chairman and CEO of PAZ Energy, LLC, which became partner with Chesapeake Energy and DFW Airport in a $2 billion natural gas project on 18,800 acres, representing 11% working interest owner in 114 wells drilled and completed with daily average 70 mcf. In 2010 the company was sold to Silver Point Capital.

References

External links

Living people
1941 births
Businesspeople from Los Angeles
University of Southern California alumni
Harvard Business School alumni
USC Sol Price School of Public Policy alumni
Bethlehem Steel people
ARCO
United States Army personnel of the Vietnam War
United States Army generals
National War College alumni
Recipients of the Silver Star
Members of the United States Army Special Forces